National Lampoon's Van Wilder: Freshman Year is the third film in the Van Wilder series, and a prequel to Van Wilder. It was released straight-to-DVD in 2009. The film was directed by Harvey Glazer and stars Jonathan Bennett, in the titular role of a young Van Wilder, Kristin Cavallari, Jerry Shea, and Steve Talley.

Plot
Van Wilder, (Jonathan Bennett), has graduated from high school. Planning to go on a road trip to Amsterdam with his dad, (Linden Ashby), when plans are cut short by his dad, who as it turns out, is busy with work, leaving Van to go it alone. Following in the family tradition, Van ends up attending Coolidge College where his family has their name, literally, on one of the buildings, Wilder Hall. However, when he gets there, Coolidge is no longer the laid-back school of his dad's time, but a military-based institution run by Dean Reardon (Kurt Fuller).

Reardon, a military man who despises senior Wilder, wants to take his aggression out on young Mr. Wilder. He can't force him out because his dad is a wealthy alumnus with close ties to the school, so he tries to make Van's life a living hell. Hilarity and hijinks ensue when Van turns a one-bed dorm room into a two-bedroom (by breaking down a wall). His roommate is Farley (Nestor Aaron Absera), a pothead from Jamaica. Against the rules, the boys decide to throw a party on campus, with such activities as making out, drugs, alcohol, sex, along with everything else considered 'fun' by the raucous Van Wilder. The only person to show up at the party is Yu Dum Fok (Jerry Shea). The boys then encounter a group of prudish girls led by Eve (Meredith Giangrande).

After Eve throws sacramental wine on them, Van pulls a prank at church. Reardon knows Van is behind the prank, so he has his ROTC students, Dirk (Steve Talley) and his closeted sidekick, Corporal Benedict (Nick Nicotera), interrogate Van, trying to make him crack. Van falls for Dirk's girlfriend, Kaitlin (Kristin Cavallari), causing Dirk to get even angrier. Kaitlin thinks, lives, and breathes the military, and believes in chastity before marriage. After playing a military game with Reardon that results in him stepping down as dean and being tasered, Van and Kaitlin end up together and Van decides to finish college. The film ends as Van leaves Dirk and Benedict tied to each other in their underwear.

Cast
 Jonathan Bennett as Van Wilder
 Kristin Cavallari as Kaitlin Hayes
 Linden Ashby as Vance Wilder Sr.
 Kurt Fuller as Dean Charles Reardon
 Steve Talley as Lt. Dirk Arnold
 Nestor Aaron Absera as Farley 
 Nick Nicotera as Corporal Benedict
 Jerry Shea as Yu Dum Fok
 Meredith Giangrande as Eve
 Irene Keng as Dongmei
 Brett Rice as Sergeant Hayes
 Jasmine Burke as Molly

Home media
Van Wilder: Freshman Year was released on DVD on July 14, 2009. As of November 2011, 226,168 DVD units have been sold, bringing in $2,994,116 in revenue.

References

External links
 

2000s sex comedy films
2009 films
American sex comedy films
Paramount Pictures direct-to-video films
Direct-to-video prequel films
Films scored by Nathan Wang
National Lampoon films
2009 comedy films
2000s English-language films
2000s American films
American prequel films